In general topology, the lexicographic ordering on the unit square (sometimes the dictionary order on the unit square) is a topology on the unit square S, i.e. on the set of points (x,y) in the plane such that  and

Construction 
Stated symbolically,

The lexicographic order topology on the unit square is the order topology induced by this ordering.

Properties 

The order topology makes S into a completely normal Hausdorff space. Since the lexicographical order on S can be proven to be complete, this topology makes S into a compact space. So S is not separable, since any dense subset has to contain at least one point in each . Hence S is not metrizable (since any compact metric space is separable); however, it is first countable. Also, S is connected and locally connected, but not path connected and not locally path connected. Its fundamental group is trivial.

See also 

 List of topologies
 Long line

Notes

References 
 

General topology
Topological spaces